Sappho at Leucate, also known as The Death of Sappho, is an oil-on-canvas painting executed by the French painter Antoine-Jean Gros in 1801. It has the dimensions of 122 by 100 cm. It is held in the Musée d'Art et d'Histoire Baron-Gérard, in Bayeux.

Description and style
The painting depicts Ancient Greek poet Sappho's alleged suicide by jumping from a cliff in Lefkada, thus accepting the legendary claim that she took her own life as a result of an unrequited love she had for the young Phaon, who is actually a mythological character. 

The figure of Sappho stands out on the edge of a cliff, in a nocturnal landscape illuminated by the rays of the moon, which appears reflected in the dark sea in front of her. The scene seems to anticipate the one illustrated by Italian poet Giacomo Leopardi in the poem "Last Song of Sappho" of 1822. She takes with her transparent veil, her lyre, which she helds high. Behind her, there is a sacrificial altar. In contrast to a static vision of the neoclassical ideal, Gros therefore outlines the traits of a romantic figure, who entrusts the end of his life for love to nature.

Charles Blanc in 1845 commented that "undertaking the pictorial representation of despair represented a fundamental deviation from the principles of Greek art". Art historian William Vaughan stated that "The Sappho of Gros is the demonstration of how an effect of an emotional nature can be transmitted by resorting to precision no less than to skill".

References

1801 paintings
Paintings by Antoine-Jean Gros
Cultural depictions of Sappho